The Old Homestead Steakhouse is a steakhouse established in 1868 whose flagship location is in Manhattan, New York City. The restaurant is the oldest continuously operating steakhouse in the United States.

History
In 1868, a German family established the Old Homestead Steakhouse, then called Tidewater Trading Post, in Manhattan's Meatpacking District on West 14th and 9th Avenue. In the 1940s long-time employee and former dishwasher, Harry Sherry, purchased the restaurant. Sherry later passed the legacy down to his family. The steakhouse is now owned and operated by his grandsons Greg and Marc Sherry.

In the mid-20th century, a Texan who enjoyed the restaurant told Harry Sherry that he would send him a cow. Two weeks later a statue of a cow was delivered and has since become a signature symbol of the Old Homestead.

In the 1990s, the restaurant was the first in the United States to introduce Wagyu beef from Japan. In order to be certified, Greg and Marc had to work with Japanese farmers to bring their facilities up to the health code standard in America.

Two additional locations were opened with one in Atlantic City at the Borgata and the other in Las Vegas at Caesars Palace. The Atlantic City location was named best restaurant in Atlantic City by Zagat's "2012 America's Top Restaurants".

The Old Homestead is the oldest continuously operating steakhouse in the United States and is senior to Keens and Peter Luger Steak House.

Ratings
In 1994, Ruth Reichl of The New York Times stated that "for sheer quantity, nothing can beat the Homestead". Reichl described the porterhouse for two as "thicker than the Manhattan phone book and twice as heavy".

See also
 List of restaurants in New York City
 List of steakhouses

References

External links

Steakhouses in New York City
Restaurants established in 1868
1868 establishments in New York (state)
Restaurants in Manhattan